The Mountains of the Iveragh Peninsula are not found in a single mountain range, but instead consist of a number of unnamed mountain ranges found on the Iveragh Peninsula of County Kerry, in Ireland. The mountains dealt with here include all those found west of Killarney National Park and the MacGillycuddy's Reeks.

Topography
There are hundreds of peaks to be found on this peninsula, many of them unnamed. Much of the peninsula's coastline is encircled by mountains, and apart from the two large river valleys of the River Inny and river Ferta, most of the peninsula's land area is hilly or mountainous. As one travels from the sea in the west inland to the east, the terrain tends to become progressively more steep and mountainous, with the highest peaks being found far inland, close to the MacGillycuddy's Reeks. The highest mountain is Stumpa Dúloigh (784 m high), with the second tallest peak being Mullaghanattin (Mullach an Aitinn), 773 m high. Some of the more notable peaks include, from east to west: Boughil (Buachaill Finnleitheid), 639 m; Knocklomena (Cnoc an Mheannáin), 641 m; Broaghnabinnia (Bruach na Binne), 745 m;  Knocknagantee, 676 m; Knockmoyle, 684 m; Meenteog, 715 m; Coomacarrea (An Tráigh), 772 m; Teermoyle Mountain, 760 m; Drung Hill, 640 m; Knocknadobar (Cnoc na dTobar), 690 m; and Coomcallee, 650 m.

See also
List of mountains in Ireland

Mountains and hills of County Kerry